Grace Tsitsi Mutandiro is a diplomat from Zimbabwe who is a Commissioner of the Public Service Commission.  She was also Ambassador to Austria serving concurrently with appointments to the Czech Republic and Slovakia and was also Zimbabwe's Permanent Representative to the International Atomic Energy Agency (IAEA), the United Nations Organisation on Crime and Drugs (UNODC), United Nations Industrial Development Organization (UNIDO) and the Preparatory Commission for the Comprehensive Nuclear-Test-Ban Treaty OrganizationPreparatory Commission to the Comprehensive Test Ban Treaty Organisation (CTBTO). She went on to serve as Secretary for Lands and Rural Resettlement, and then Secretary for Environment, Water and Climate.

Mutandiro earned a Bachelor of Administration degree (1979, University of Rhodesia! Now known as University of Zimbabwe) and a Bachelor of Laws degree (2002) at the University of South Africa).

References

University of South Africa alumni
Zimbabwean women ambassadors
Ambassadors of Zimbabwe to Austria
Ambassadors of Zimbabwe to the Czech Republic
Ambassadors of Zimbabwe to Slovakia
University of Zimbabwe alumni
United Nations Industrial Development Organization people
International Atomic Energy Agency officials
Year of birth missing (living people)
Living people